Grand-Bouctouche  is a Canadian town in Kent County, New Brunswick.

History

Bouctouche was originally named Tjipogtotjg (pronounced Chebooktoosk), a Mi'kmaq word meaning "Great Little Harbour".

The region was next settled by brothers Francois LeBlanc and Charles LeBlanc, and brothers Isidore Bastarache and Joseph Bastarache in 1785 as an Acadian community. "La Croix commémorative aux fondateurs de Bouctouche" was unveiled August 29, 1954, to pay tribute to the founders of the town, who first arrived in 1785. It says "We remember François and Hélène (née Breau) LeBlanc; Charlitte and first wife Marie (née Breau) LeBlanc, and his second wife Madeleine (née Girouard); and Joseph and Marie (née Girouard) Bastarache". The stones at the base of the cross indicate the origins of the settlers who came from France, Grand-Pré, Memramcook and Bouctouche. During the 19th century the area also attracted immigrants from Ireland and Scotland among them the forefathers of one of Bouctouche's best-known sons, K.C. Irving.

Bouctouche was struck by a tornado on August 6, 1879.

On 1 January 2023, Bouctouche was renamed Grand-Bouctouche and annexed the local service district (LSD) of Sainte-Anne-de-Kent and portions of the LSDs of the parish of Richibucto, the parish of Sainte-Marie, and the parish of Wellington.The community's name remains in official use.

Revised census figures have not been released.

Geography
The town is located at the mouth of the Bouctouche River on the coast of the Northumberland Strait, approximately 40 kilometres northeast of Moncton.

It is the first municipality in New Brunswick to adopt a Green Plan for the working of the municipality in 2006.

Climate

Demographics

Population trend 

Religious make-up (2001)

Income (2006)

Mother Tongue language (2016)

Tourist attractions

La Dune de Bouctouche, known by its first inhabitants as the Great Little Harbour, has hiking and cycling trails that are part of the New Brunswick Trail system. There are 12 kilometres of whispering sands making up the dunes easily viewed from a boardwalk along a conservation area known as the Irving Eco Centre. La Dune de Bouctouche consists of a 9.7 km long ridge of sand formed over centuries by the wind and stormy seas. The dune has almost enclosed the bay area over its full length leaving an opening to the bay at its mouth that is a 1.8 km wide opening and the dune is still expanding today.
Le Pays de la Sagouine, based on Antonine Maillet's award-winning book La Sagouine, is a theme park filled with Acadian entertainment and history. Their activities include dramatic reproductions of Antonine's plays.
Irving Eco Centre Industrialist Kenneth Colin Irving was born in Bouctouche, many of his businesses, including Kent Homes, maintain operations there, and his descendants have set aside an area of natural resources to be protected.

Notable people

Sister cities
St. Martinville, Louisiana, United States
Châtellerault, France

See also
List of lighthouses in New Brunswick

References

External links 
 Town of Bouctouche

 
Populated coastal places in Canada
Towns in New Brunswick
Lighthouses in New Brunswick